Mohammed Saeed Bekheitan (1945 – 11 March 2022) was a Syrian politician who was the Assistant Secretary of the Syrian Regional Command of the Ba'ath Party. He held the position since 2005. He was a close associate of Syrian President Bashar al-Assad and his brother Maher al-Assad and was considered a senior decision-maker in the government.

Biography
Bukheitan was a Sunni Muslim from Bedouin origins in Deir ez-Zor, a Sunni dominated region near the border with Iraq. He built his career in the police, eventually attaining the rank of general in the criminal security branch of the Ministry of Interior. From 1993 to 2000 he served as Governor of Hama, a major Sunni region in Syria. Since June 2000, he has been on the Regional Command of the Syrian Ba'ath Party. He headed the important National Security Bureau from 2000 to 2005 and since then has been the Assistant Secretary of the Syrian Regional Command of the Baath Party, the second highest position in the political party after the Syrian president.

Bekheitan was described by sources as an old guard Ba'athist who opposed reform efforts in Syria, even from inside the Ba'ath party. He was sanctioned by the European Union for "his senior decision making role in the repression of protesters participating in the Syrian Civil War". He died on 11 March 2022.

References

1945 births
2022 deaths
Members of the Regional Command of the Arab Socialist Ba'ath Party – Syria Region
People of the Syrian civil war
Syrian Sunni Muslims
Survivors of terrorist attacks
People from Deir ez-Zor